Birch Bluff is a summit in the U.S. state of Wisconsin.

Birch Bluff was so named for the abundant birch timber in the area.

References

Landforms of Wood County, Wisconsin
Mountains of Wisconsin